WWGK (1540 AM) is a commercial daytime-only radio station licensed to Cleveland, Ohio, that is currently silent. Owned by Good Karma Brands, it has previously operated as an ESPN Radio affiliate. The transmitter tower for WWGK is located on Euclid Avenue at East 81st Street in Cleveland's Fairfax neighborhood.

History

WJMO (1947–1959) 

The station's roots trace back to WJMO, which went on the air on June 1, 1947, licensed to Cleveland as a daytime-only broadcaster at 1540 kHz with studios at 2157 Euclid Avenue and a power of 1,000 watts. The owner was Wentworth J. Marshall, formerly head of the Marshall Drug Co. chain, and the general manager was David M. Baylor. When it debuted, WJMO was the only Cleveland radio station without a network affiliation. As a result, the station specialized in recorded music. Early staff included Gene Carroll (mornings), Howie Lund (afternoons), and Billy Evans on sports.

In 1948, WJMO carried the football games of Western Reserve College Red Cats, both at home from League Park and on the road. In the first broadcast on September 25 Gil Gibbons called the action as Western Reserve met Western Michigan in Kalamazoo.

On June 5, 1952, in an attempt to emphasize music rather than DJs, Baylor issued an orders to play four songs every 15 minutes. As a result, a number of DJs chose to leave the station. Later than year, Wentworth sold the station on August 20 for $100,000 to Maryland-based United Broadcasting, headed by Richard Eaton. Ownership was later put in the name of Eaton's affiliated company Friendly Broadcasting of Ohio. An FM license was granted for the 106.5 MHz facility that was to take the WJMO-FM call letters, but it was slated to sign on by 1959.

WABQ (1959–2006) 

Meanwhile, WSRS, which was founded by S.R. Sague on December 12, 1947, broadcast 24-hours a day on 1490 kHz licensed to suburban Cleveland Heights, and had an FM complement at 95.3 MHz. On January 14, 1959, WJMO bought WSRS (at 1490 AM and 95.3 FM) and exchanged respective callsigns, studios/facilities, and staffs. Both 1540 AM and 106.5 FM were sold off to Tuschman Broadcasting Company with the switch; the 1540 facility immediately became WABQ and the 106.5 facility instead signed on as WABQ-FM before switching to WXEN that next year, carrying an ethnic format.

Detroit-based Booth Broadcasting took ownership of WABQ and WXEN in the mid-1960s. During the late 1950s and early 1960s, both WABQ and WJMO focused on programming aimed at Cleveland's African American community, featuring mostly black on-air talent.

It was best known for a Top 40/R&B format as "Tiger Radio" in the late 1960s (Booth's WJLB in Detroit used the same "Tiger Radio" slogan at the time), featuring personalities like Lynn Tolliver and Ken Hawkins, Michael "The Lover" Payne and King Curtis Shaw, Jimmy O'jay, Jimmy Stephens, Jim Raggs and Eddie Edwards.  Mike Dix, Rich Ford, Chuck Denson, Otis Rush and Duane Jones were just a few of the many news announcers the station featured during the late 1960s and early seventies. The station's popular "Ring-A-Ding" talk show featured Olympic gold medalist Harrison Dillard who also handled sportscasts.  Gospel programming in the late weekday morning hours was presented by Cleveland's First Lady of Gospel, Mary Holt. Sundays featured wall-to-wall church programming with Denver Wilborn as host.

Throughout the late 1960s and into the early to mid-1970s WABQ and WJMO competed for listeners among Cleveland's African-American community with WJMO often enjoying a slight ratings edge due to its ability to remain on the air after local sunset.

In April 1968 WABQ received special temporary authority from the FCC to stay on the air overnight in an attempt to help inform and comfort the community following the assassination of Dr. Martin Luther King.  The special authority to remain on the air 24 hours a day expired after just a day or two.

WABQ's heyday quietly faded into the 1970s and 1980s, and went through numerous format changes since. Booth Broadcasting sold off WABQ in 1984, and several different ownership changes followed as a result. Eventually, the station assumed a gospel music format and had local ownership for much of those years since.

WWGK (2006–present) 

Dale Edwards' D&E Communications sold off WABQ to Beaver Dam, Wisconsin-based Good Karma Broadcasting, LLC., in July 2006 for $2.5 million (equivalent to $ in ). The transaction occurred two weeks after ESPN Radio terminated their affiliation with Salem Communications-owned WKNR, giving that station a 90-day notice. The purchase was seen by Good Karma founder and president Craig Karmazin as "the next logical market" for the chain to expand to; along with an AM/FM duopoly in Beaver Dam, Good Karma's portfolio consisted mostly of sports stations in Madison, Milwaukee and West Palm Beach, all affiliated with ESPN. Just before the sale closed, WABQ swapped callsigns on October 24, 2006, with Painesville station WBKC, which Dale Edwards retained ownership of and installed a similar gospel format onto. Temporarily known as WBKC,  relaunched as "ESPN Radio 1540" on October 28, 2006, adopting the WWGK calls on November 7.

While ESPN's cancellation notice included that the network was planning to have a 24-hour presence in the market—something WKNR was unable to provide—WABQ's daytime-only status equally prevented such a presence. Speculation existed about a possible time-brokerage agreement with Good Karma purchasing nighttime hours on WERE, but it was never consummated. This also meant that a weekday program hosted by Craig Karmazin and Steve Politziner was unable to be carried in Cleveland throughout the winter months. Undeterred, Karmazin moved to Cleveland in order to help oversee the launch of WWGK, a practice he had done at other sports station launches in the Good Karma chain. Karmazin also predicted that WWGK could have a positive cash flow within 18 months even with the station's technical limitations.

Weeks after WWGK's launch, Good Karma purchased WKNR from Salem for $7 million (equivalent to $ in ) on December 4, 2006, putting both stations under one roof. The sale caught Karmazin partially off guard, as he didn't anticipate owning both WWGK and WKNR until Salem agreed to sell at the last minute. While Good Karma immediately took over management of WKNR via a local marketing agreement, ESPN programming remained exclusive to WWGK but Karmazin hinted at moving the affiliation back to WKNR, saying "that's part of the great conversation we're having now." Such a realignment took place on February 23, 2007, with WKNR regaining the ESPN affiliation full-time and WWGK adding some Fox Sports Radio programming, rebranded "KNR2". Both stations relocated to a $500,000 studio facility at the Galleria at Erieview that opened late in 2007.

Since the 2007 consolidation into WKNR, WWGK has largely operated as a "pass-through" for ESPN programming as a complement to WKNR's locally based lineup. One notable exception was X's and O's with The Pros, an hour-long show hosted by LeCharles Bentley and Je'Rod Cherry that debuted on WWGK in 2009 and moved to WKNR the following year. All Fox Sports programming was dropped on August 29, 2011, when WKRK-FM switched from alternative rock to a sports format of their own. The Jim Rome Show, a fixture on WKNR since 1998, was displaced onto the WWGK lineup by July 2013 after WKNR's increased commitment to Cleveland Browns-produced programming included a daily program that aired in Rome's time slot. Previously, the first hour of Rome's show aired on WWGK after additional hours were given to Tony Rizzo's late-morning program on WKNR.

Following the onset of the COVID-19 pandemic in the United States, WWGK temporarily switched to a relay of Sirius XM's "Doctor Radio" channel and related COVID-19 information programming on April 22, 2020; this followed a similar move by Good Karma's WAUK in Milwaukee. Conversely, WKNR's programming was largely unaffected, with all locally based and network programming remaining in place, even as all but two of the duopoly's personnel were forced to work from home. WWGK quietly reverted to ESPN programming full-time by the end of the summer. WWGK's lineup onward included the entirety of ESPN's morning show Keyshawn, JWill and Max while The Paul Finebaum Show aired in afternoon drive. The station also aired Notre Dame College football play-by-play.

On December 21, 2021, Good Karma Brands filed paperwork with the FCC to suspend WWGK's on-air operations for one year. In the letter, Good Karma cited "technical complications making it difficult to maintain on-air status" at the current transmitter site and intends to find "a financially viable technical solution".

References

External links 

1947 establishments in Ohio
Radio stations established in 1947
WGK
WGK